David Edward Card (born 1956) is a Canadian-American labour economist and professor of economics at the University of California, Berkeley. He was awarded half of the 2021 Nobel Memorial Prize in Economic Sciences "for his empirical contributions to labour economics", with Joshua Angrist and Guido Imbens jointly awarded the other half.

Early life and career
David Card was born in Guelph, Ontario, in 1956. His parents were dairy farmers. Card earned his Bachelor of Arts degree from Queen's University in 1978 and his Ph.D. degree in economics in 1983 from Princeton University, after completing a doctoral dissertation titled "Indexation in long term labor contracts" under the supervision of Orley Ashenfelter.

Card began his career at the University of Chicago Graduate School of Business, where he was Assistant Professor of Business Economics for 2 years. He was on the faculty at Princeton University from 1983 to 1997, before moving to Berkeley; from 1990 to 1991 he served as a visiting professor at Columbia University. From 1988 to 1992, Card was Associate Editor of the Journal of Labor Economics and from 1993 to 1997, he was co-editor of Econometrica. From 2002 to 2005, he was co-editor of The American Economic Review.

Academic work
In the early 1990s, Card received much attention for his finding, together with his then Princeton University colleague Alan B. Krueger that, contrary to widely accepted beliefs among economists, the minimum wage increase in New Jersey did not result in job reduction of fast food companies in that state. While the methodology (see difference in differences) and its claim have been disputed (see minimum wage for discussion), later studies of minimum wage increases have tended to confirm Card and Krueger's findings, and many economists, including Joseph Stiglitz and Paul Krugman, accept these findings.

David Card has also made contributions to research on immigration, education, job training and inequality. Much of Card's work centers on a comparison between the United States and Canada in various situations. On immigration, Card's research has shown that the economic impact of new immigrants is minimal. Card has done several case studies on the rapid assimilation of immigrant groups, finding that they have little or no impact on wages. For example, Card studied the economic impacts of the Mariel boatlift, and compared the economic effects in Miami to those in Atlanta, Houston, Los Angeles and Tampa, which receive fewer Cuban immigrants. Card found that despite the drastic increase in low-skilled labor in Miami by 7%, wages for the low-skilled workers were not significantly affected. Furthermore, he found that overall unemployment rates and wages for the labor market as a whole in Miami were unchanged by the sudden influx of immigrants. In an interview with The New York Times, Card said, "I honestly think the economic arguments [against immigration] are second order. They are almost irrelevant." This does not imply, however, that Card believes immigration should be increased, merely that immigrants do not pose a threat to the labour market.

Despite the fact that Card sometimes researches issues with strong political implications, he does not publicly take a stand on political issues or make policy suggestions. Nevertheless, his work is regularly cited in support of increased immigration and minimum wage legislation.

He served as the expert witness for Harvard in the Harvard admissions case.

Awards
He was the recipient of the 1995 John Bates Clark Medal, awarded to "that American economist under the age of forty who is judged to have made the most significant contribution to economic thought and knowledge" for his work related to the minimum wage as well as the economic effects of the Mariel boatlift. He gave the 2009 Richard T. Ely Lecture of the American Economic Association in San Francisco. A 2011 survey of economics professors named Card their fifth favorite living economist under the age of 60. Along with N. Gregory Mankiw, he was elected vice president of the American Economic Association for 2014.

He has received along with Richard Blundell the 2014 BBVA Foundation Frontiers of Knowledge Award in Economics, Finance and Management category for "their contributions to empirical microeconomics," in the words of the jury's citation. "Motivated by important empirical questions, they developed and estimated appropriate econometric models, making significant methodological contributions in the process. Both are known for their attention to institutional detail, careful and innovative research design, rigorous application of econometric tools, and dispassionate reporting of results."

Card was elected as a member of the U.S. National Academy of Sciences in 2021. He won the Nobel Memorial Prize in Economic Sciences in 2021.

Publications

Books

References

External links

 David Card's homepage at the UC Berkeley Department of Economics
 David Card, Director, Center for Labor Economics at the UC Berkeley Center for Labor Economics
 Interview with David Card, The Region, Federal Reserve Bank of Minneapolis, December 1, 2006
 
 

1956 births
Living people
21st-century American economists
American Nobel laureates
Canadian economists
Canadian expatriate academics in the United States
Canadian Nobel laureates
Columbia University faculty
Education economists
Fellows of the American Academy of Arts and Sciences
Fellows of the Econometric Society
Labor economists
Microeconometricians
Migration economists
Nobel laureates in Economics
Presidents of the American Economic Association
Princeton University alumni
Princeton University faculty
Queen's University at Kingston alumni
University of California, Berkeley College of Letters and Science faculty
University of Chicago faculty